Selfrid F. Johansson (March 12, 1907 – July 26, 1976) was a Swedish boxer who competed in the 1928 Summer Olympics.

In 1928 he was eliminated in the second round of the welterweight class after losing his fight to the upcoming gold medalist Ted Morgan.

External links
profile

1907 births
1976 deaths
Welterweight boxers
Olympic boxers of Sweden
Boxers at the 1928 Summer Olympics
Swedish male boxers
20th-century Swedish people